HMS Brereton (M1113) was a  of the Royal Navy. Brereton was built by the Lowestoft shipbuilder Richard Ironworks, and was launched in 1953 and entered service in 1954.

Construction and design
Brereton was ordered on 9 September 1950 and was originally to be named Red Beetle, was laid down at Richard Ironworks' Lowestoft yard on 25 September 1951. The ship was renamed Brereton in March 1952. Brereton was launched on 14 March 1953 and commissioned on 9 July 1954.

Armament consisted of a single Bofors 40 mm anti-aircraft gun forward and two Oerlikon 20 mm cannon aft. Minesweeping equipment included wire sweeps for sweeping moored contact mines and acoustic or magnetic sweeps for dealing with influence mines. The ship had a crew of 27 in peacetime and 39 in wartime.

Service
Brereton joined the South Wales division of the Royal Navy Reserve  in September 1954 and was renamed HMS St David in May 1955. She served as such until November 1961, when her name reverted to Brereton. In 1965 she joined the Royal Navy's Fishery Protection Squadron.

From July 1967 to December 1968 Brereton was converted to a minehunter at Portsmouth. Armament was changed to two Bofors guns, although one was later removed.

In 1969 Brereton joined the 9th Mine Countermeasures Squadron based in the Persian Gulf, returning to British waters in December 1971. In 1971, she rejoined the Fishery Protection Squadron. On 12 February 1976 she collided with the Danish fishing Vessel Cyrano off Hartlepool, and was holed below the waterline, having to be taken under tow by the salvage vessel RMAS Kinloss. Brereton was under repair until August that year. She suffered an engine room fire in June 1978, with repairs lasting two months, and was refitted at Gibraltar in 1979. In 1980, she joined the Tyne Division of the Royal Navy Reserve, part of the 10th Mine Countermeasures Squadron, and in 1981, the Mersey Division. She remained based on the Mersey in 1984. In 1986, she joined the 3rd Mine Countermeasures Squadron based at Rosyth, and in February 1987, while on exercise in Scapa Flow with other members of the squadron, destroyed a German mine dating from the Second World War. While remaining part of the 3rd MCS, she was seconded to the Fishery Protection Squadron. She was paid off on 30 April 1991 and was broken up in Bruges from 1992.

Notes

References

 

 

Ton-class minesweepers of the Royal Navy
1953 ships